The Cerro Vanguardia Mine is a gold and silver mine located 150 km north west of Puerto San Julián, in the Santa Cruz province of Argentina. It is majority-owned and operated by AngloGold Ashanti, which holds a 92.5% interest in the mine . The remaining 7.5% are owned by Formicruz (Fomento Minero de Santa Cruz Sociedad del Estado), a company owned by the province of Santa Cruz.

In 2008, the mine contributed 3% to the company's annual production and employs in excess of 1,000 people. The Cerro Vanguardia mine consists of a number of small open pits.

Geologically the mine lies in Deseado Massif, an area known for its valuable gold deposits.

History
The gold deposit at Cerro Vanguardia was first discovered in 1976 and, in 1987, mining group Pérez Companc S.A. formed a mineral exploration joint venture with AMSA, Anglo American’s South American holding company.

AngloGold, predecessor of AngloGold Ashanti, acquired a 46.23% interest in the project in 1998–99, and an additional 46.25%, the Pérez Companc stake, in July 2002, doubling its interest to 92.5%. AngloGold Ashanti owns the right to exploit the
deposit for 40 years based on the Usufruct Agreement, signed in
December 1996. Cerro Vanguardia, which was constructed at a total cost of US$ 270 million, was commissioned in late 1998.

The mine suffered a difficult year in 2008, when production fell by 25% while the cash cost more than doubled. The company did however manage to improve production in 2009 and lower the cash cost again. In 2009, the mine was also fatality-free for the seventh consecutive year.

Future mining plans at Cerro Vanguardia include an underground operation, from 2010, and a heap leach operation.

Gold production
Recent production figures of the mine were:

References

External links 
Formicruz website 
AngloGold Ashanti website
AngloGold Ashanti: Country report Argentina 

AngloGold Ashanti
Gold mines in Argentina
Mines in Santa Cruz Province, Argentina
Open-pit mines
Silver mines in Argentina
Surface mines in Argentina